Masuzawa Dam is a gravity dam located in Yamagata Prefecture in Japan. The dam is used for irrigation. The catchment area of the dam is 29.8 km2. The dam impounds about 45  ha of land when full and can store 6805 thousand cubic meters of water. The construction of the dam was completed in 1963.

References

Dams in Yamagata Prefecture
1963 establishments in Japan